The Holy Trinity Church (Sourp Yerrortutyun), also called Zvartnots, is an Armenian Catholic church in al-Midan district of Aleppo, Syria.

Overview
The consecration of the church took place in 1965, on the occasion of the 50th anniversary of the Armenian genocide and was renovated in 1990. Its structure resembles the one of Zvartnots in Armenia. The architect of the church is Pascal Paboudjian.

The Zvartnots primary school known in Arabic as al-Farah School located within the church complex, belongs to the Armenian Catholic Archeparchy of Aleppo, operating from kindergarten to 9th grade.

See also
Armenians in Syria
List of churches in Aleppo

References

Trinity
Roman Catholic churches completed in 1965
Armenian Catholic churches in Syria
20th-century Roman Catholic church buildings